Predictive value of tests is the probability of a target condition given by the result of a test, often in regard to medical tests.

In cases where binary classification can be applied to the test results, such yes versus no, test target (such as a substance, symptom or sign) being present versus absent, or either a positive or negative test), then each of the two outcomes has a separate predictive value. For example, for positive or negative test, the predictive values are termed positive predictive value or negative predictive value, respectively.
In cases where the test result is of a continuous value, the predictive value generally changes continuously along with the value. For example, for a pregnancy test that displays the urine concentration of hCG, the predictive value increases with increasing hCG value.

A conversion of continuous values into binary values can be performed, such as designating a pregnancy test as "positive" above a certain cutoff value, but this confers a loss of information and generally results in less accurate predictive values.

See also
 Positive predictive value
 Negative predictive value

References

Medical tests